Matteo Berrettini (born 12 April 1996) is an Italian professional tennis player. He has been ranked as high as world No. 6 in singles by the Association of Tennis Professionals (ATP), which he achieved in January 2022, and world No. 105 in doubles achieved on July 2019. Berrettini has won seven ATP Tour singles titles and two doubles titles, and produced his best major performance by reaching the singles final of the 2021 Wimbledon Championships. He has also reached the quarterfinals or better at all four majors, being the first man born in the 1990s and the first Italian man to achieve the feat.

After turning professional in 2015, Berrettini won two singles titles on the ITF World Tennis Tour and three on the ATP Challenger Tour, breaking into the top 100 of the ATP rankings in May 2018. Two months later, he reached his first ATP Tour final at the 2018 Swiss Open, where he won his maiden title and made his top 60 debut. In 2019, after claiming two further titles at the Hungarian Open and Stuttgart Open, he entered into the top 25, and carried his momentum into his maiden career major semifinal at the US Open to end the year ranked in the top 10. Berrettini made additional strides in 2021, after reaching his first Masters 1000 final at the Madrid Open, winning his first ATP 500 title at the Queen's Club Championships, and becoming the first Italian player, male or female, to contest a Wimbledon singles final.

Berrettini is known for his aggressive game style boosted by his large build. At , Berrettini possesses one of the tour's fastest serves and often uses his heavy topspin forehand to dictate rallies and set up one-two punches, making him versatile on all surfaces. In order to compensate for his weaknesses, he often deploys his backhand slice to keep the ball low for his opponent and uses a blocked return to neutralize points. As an all-court player, he has also developed these tactics to be comfortable at the net to close points.

Professional career

2017: ATP debut
Berrettini made his ATP main draw debut at the Italian Open after earning a wildcard in the pre-qualifying wildcard tournament. He was defeated by Fabio Fognini in the first round. He was the top seed in the eight man Italian field competing for the final spot in the inaugural Next Generation ATP Finals in Milan, but lost to Filippo Baldi in straight sets.

2018: First title
After qualifying for the 2018 Qatar ExxonMobil Open, ranked No. 135, he notched his first tour-level win over No. 55 Viktor Troicki. On his next tournament, he entered his first Grand Slam main draw as a lucky loser at Australian Open but lost in the first round to No. 27 Adrian Mannarino.

At the Swiss Open Gstaad, Berrettini won his first ATP title, defeating Roberto Bautista Agut in the final. He also won his first ATP doubles title at the same event, partnering with Daniele Bracciali.

2019: Major semifinal and top 10
At the Hungarian Open, Berrettini won his second ATP singles title, defeating Filip Krajinović in the final. Berrettini continued his form into the following week as he reached the final at the Bavarian International Tennis Championships. There, his nine-match winning streak was snapped by Cristian Garín in a third set tie-breaker. At the Italian Open, Berrettini upset Alexander Zverev in the round of 32 for his first win against a top-5 player.

Berrettini's improvement continued into the grass court season, winning his third singles title in Stuttgart over Félix Auger-Aliassime in the final. Berrettini's serve was not broken throughout the entire tournament, thereby making him only the fifth man since 1999 to win two tournaments without dropping serve (the other occasion coming at the 2018 Gstaad Open). The following week, Berrettini reached his first ATP 500 semifinal at the Halle Open where he was defeated by David Goffin. Following the tournament, the Italian broke into the top-20.

As the 17th seed at Wimbledon, Berrettini reached the fourth round of a Grand Slam for the first time after defeating Diego Schwartzman in five sets. He then lost to eight-time champion Roger Federer comprehensively in 74 minutes. After congratulating Federer for his win during their post-match handshake, Berrettini jokingly asked Federer, "Thanks for the tennis lesson, how much do I owe you?"

Berrettini withdrew from his next two events in Gstaad and Montreal, citing an ankle injury. He played a lead-up tournament in Cincinnati before competing in the US Open. There, despite his lack of preparation, Berettini reached his first Major quarterfinal after defeating Andrey Rublev in the fourth round. He then beat Gaël Monfils in a fifth set tiebreak to become the first Italian man to reach the US Open semifinals since 1977. Berrettini's run ended against eventual champion Rafael Nadal in straight sets, despite holding two set points in the opening-set tiebreak.

Pursuing an ATP Finals berth, Berrettini achieved his best Masters result yet at the Shanghai Masters by reaching the semifinals. Along the way Berrettini claimed his second career top-5 victory by beating Dominic Thiem in the quarterfinals. Another semifinal appearance at the Vienna Open saw Berrettini break into the top ten rankings. As world number 8, Berrettini claimed the final spot in the 2019 ATP Finals in London. There, he lost his opening two round robin matches to Novak Djokovic and Roger Federer, before becoming the first Italian man to win a match at the event by defeating Dominic Thiem.

2020: Stagnant results
After withdrawing from the ATP Cup due to physical problems, at the Australian Open, Berrettini beat Andrew Harris before losing to Tennys Sandgren in the second round. After the tour shutdown and return due to the COVID-19 pandemic, he won the Ultimate Tennis Showdown. He lost in the third round to Reilly Opelka in Cincinnati.

At the US Open, he reached the fourth round without dropping a set. He then lost to Andrey Rublev in four sets in a rematch of the previous year's fourth round.

He reached the quarterfinals in Rome for the first time, losing to Casper Ruud. Berrettini reached the third round at the French Open. At the Paris Masters, he lost to Marcos Giron in the first round, citing physical pain. Despite his weak results, Berrettini finished in the top-10 for the second consecutive year (due to his 2019 ranking points being protected by the post COVID-19 ranking changes).

2021: Wimbledon final
Berrettini's strong performance advanced Italy to the final of the 2021 ATP Cup against Russia, where he lost to Daniil Medvedev in straight sets. At the Australian Open, he reached the fourth round but withdrew from the tournament with abdominal pain. Berrettini remained out of competition until the clay season in April, where he won his first singles title in over a year at the Serbia Open over Aslan Karatsev. In May at the Madrid Open, he reached his first Masters 1000 final, which he lost to Alexander Zverev in three sets.

At the French Open, Berrettini became the first Italian man to reach the fourth round at each major. He reached his second career major quarterfinal when Roger Federer withdrew ahead of their fourth-round match. In the quarterfinals, he lost in four sets against World No. 1 Novak Djokovic.

On 20 June Berrettini won the biggest title of his career at the Queen's Club Championships, his first at the ATP 500 level. He became the first Italian in history to win this title, defeating three Britons en route (Andy Murray, Dan Evans, and Cameron Norrie).

At the Wimbledon Championships, Berrettini reached his second straight Major quarterfinal, then defeated Felix Auger-Aliassime in four sets to reach his first Wimbledon semifinal, becoming the first Italian man in the Open Era to reach the Wimbledon semifinals and the first since Nicola Pietrangeli in 1960. He advanced to his maiden major final after beating Hubert Hurkacz, becoming the first Italian to reach a Wimbledon singles final and the first Italian man to reach a major final since Adriano Panatta at the 1976 French Open. There, he lost to Novak Djokovic in four sets.

At the US Open, Berrettini reached the quarterfinals following wins over Ilya Ivashka and Oscar Otte. He then lost to Novak Djokovic in four sets, in a repeat of the Wimbledon final. At the ATP Finals, Berrettini was forced to withdraw with an abdominal injury during his first match with Alexander Zverev.

2022: Australian Open semis, world No. 6
At the Australian Open, Berrettini reached the quarterfinals for the first time after defeating Brandon Nakashima, Stefan Kozlov, Carlos Alcaraz, and Pablo Carreño Busta en route. He became the first man born in the 1990s and the first Italian man to reach the quarterfinals at all four majors. By defeating Monfils in five sets, Berrettini then became the first Italian man to reach the singles semifinals at the tournament. There, he was stopped by eventual champion Nadal in four sets, but as a result of his run, he improved to a career-high ranking of world No. 6. Following a poor outing in Rio de Janeiro and an early retirement in Acapulco, he then traveled to Indian Wells, where he was dispatched in the fourth round by Miomir Kecmanović in three sets. Soon after, Berrettini announced that he had sustained an injury to his right hand that necessitated emergency surgery, forcing him to withdraw from Miami and the tour's clay swing, including the French Open, in order to fully recover.

Berrettini returned for the tour's grasscourt season at the Stuttgart Open in early June, and found his form by winning the title. He later confirmed his form, winning his second title at the Queen's Club Championships.

He withdrew from the 2022 Wimbledon Championships after testing positive for COVID-19. In July 2022, Berrettini entered the Swiss Open Gstaad final and lost in three sets against Casper Ruud. At the US Open, Berrettini defeated Andy Murray in the third round. He reached the quarterfinals after defeating Alejandro Davidovich Fokina in five sets. In the quarterfinals, he lost to Casper Ruud in straight sets. At the 2022 Laver Cup, Berrettini was named an alternate for Team Europe, and replaced Roger Federer mid-tournament, after Federer played the final match of his career in doubles.

Playing style

Berrettini is an aggressive all-court player known for his strong serve and forehand. His primary weapon is his forehand, known for its speed, spin and depth. His favorite surface is grass. In describing his build, American former tennis player Jim Courier compared Berrettini to a rugby player or a linebacker and described how that laid the foundation for his game style. Berrettini focuses on setting up quick points and hitting winners with aggressive play and putting pressure on his opponent. His transitional and net game are also integral parts of his game to finish off points, and he has been known to serve-and-volley. His aggressive game grounded in big serves and forehands have led to many to compare him to Fernando González and Juan Martín del Potro.

Despite having a weaker and less consistent backhand, Berrettini has developed a blocked return and deploys his developed backhand slice to neutralize aggression and keep the ball low. This slice allows him to set up aggressive forehands. He has good disguise on his dropshot on both wings, often following with an approach to the net.

Berrettini's weaknesses are his defensive game and consistency. He suffers most when put under pressure by opponents and is forced to defend on the run, especially when attacked on the backhand wing. Prior to 2019, Berrettini's inconsistency was also a major obstacle to his success, though it has shown signs of improvement since. However, drops in mental focus and his naturally aggressive game are responsible for his high number of unforced errors.

Personal life
Born in Rome to Luca Berrettini and Claudia Bigo, Berrettini has a younger brother, Jacopo, who is also a tennis player. Berrettini is of partial Brazilian descent through his maternal grandmother Lucia Fogaça, a Brazilian born in Rio de Janeiro.   

From 2019 to 2022, he was in a relationship with Croatian-born Australian tennis player Ajla Tomljanović.

Career statistics

Grand Slam tournament performance timeline

Current through the 2023 Australian Open.

Important finals

Grand Slam tournament finals

Singles: 1 (1 runner-up)

Masters 1000 tournament finals

Singles: 1 (1 runner-up)

See also
Matteo Berrettini career statistics
Italian players best ranking
Tennis in Italy

References

External links

1996 births
Italian male tennis players
Living people
Tennis players from Rome
Italian people of Brazilian descent
Expatriate sportspeople in Monaco